Judge Woods may refer to:

Charles Albert Woods (1852–1925), judge of the United States Court of Appeals for the Fourth Circuit
George E. Woods (1923–2007), judge of the United States District Court for the Eastern District of Michigan
Gregory H. Woods (born 1969), judge of the United States District Court for the Southern District of New York
Henry Woods (judge) (1918–2002), judge of the United States District Court for the Eastern District of Arkansas
William Allen Woods (1837–1901), judge of the United States Court of Appeals for the Seventh Circuit

See also
Judge Wood (disambiguation)
Justice Woods (disambiguation)